Dionathã da Silva (born 24 January 1998), commonly known as Dionathã, is a Brazilian footballer who plays as a winger or striker for Boa Esporte.

Club career 

Dionathã is a youth exponent from Grêmio. He made his league debut on 13 August 2017 against Botafogo in a 1–0 away loss. He replaced Batista after 66 minutes. At 2 September 2017, Dionathã scored his first league goal, the latter in a 5–0 home win against Sport Recife.

References

1998 births
Living people
Association football forwards
Association football wingers
Brazilian footballers
Avaí FC players
Grêmio Foot-Ball Porto Alegrense players
Paysandu Sport Club players
U.D. Oliveirense players
Campeonato Brasileiro Série A players
Campeonato Brasileiro Série B players
Liga Portugal 2 players